William Morrison (31 March 1934 – 2001) was a Scottish professional footballer who played as a wing half for Sunderland.

References

1934 births
2001 deaths
Footballers from Edinburgh
Scottish footballers
Association football wing halves
Sunderland A.F.C. players
Southend United F.C. players
Bedford Town F.C. players
English Football League players